Co-Co may refer to:

 Co-Co locomotive, a classification for a locomotive wheel arrangement with two six-wheeled bogies with all axles powered, with a separate motor per axle
 Co-Co (band), a British pop group
"Co-Co" (Sweet song), 1971
 Co-co! Magazine, a Hong Kong magazine
 Abbreviation for Contingent convertible bond

See also
 Coco (disambiguation)
 Cocoa (disambiguation)
 Koko (disambiguation)
 Coca (disambiguation)